Albert Ludick (born 14 April 1939) is a South African boxer. He competed in the men's flyweight event at the 1956 Summer Olympics. At the 1956 Summer Olympics, he lost to Abel Laudonio of Argentina.

References

1939 births
Living people
Flyweight boxers
South African male boxers
Olympic boxers of South Africa
Boxers at the 1956 Summer Olympics
People from Mahikeng Local Municipality